The 1986 Newham London Borough Council election for the Newham London Borough Council was held on 8 May 1986.  The whole council was up for election. Turnout was 30.7%. Labour, for the first time, won all 60 seats.

Election result

|}

Background
A total of 184 candidates stood in the election for the 60 seats being contested across 24 wards. Candidates included a full slate from the Labour party, whilst the Conservative party stood 51 candidates. The Liberal and SDP parties ran 37 joint candidates whilst the Liberal party also ran 11 candidates under the Liberal Alliance Focus Team banner. Other candidates included 12 Independents, 8 Green, 1 Communist, 2 Revolutionary Communist and 2 National Front.

Results by ward

Beckton

Bemersyde

Canning Town & Grange

Castle

Central

Custom House & Silvertown

Forest Gate

Greatfield

Hudsons

Kensington

Little Ilford

Manor Park

Monega

New Town

Ordnance

Park

Plaistow

Plashet

St Stephens

South

Stratford

Upton

Wall End

West Ham

By-elections between 1986 and 1990

South

The by-election was called following the resignation death of Cllr. John Wilson.

Little Ilford

The by-election was called following the resignation of Cllr. Colin M. Copus.

St Stephens

The by-election was called following the death of Cllr. Thomas Nolan.

Plashet

The by-election was called following the resignation of Cllr. Joseph C. Sambrano.

References

1986
1986 London Borough council elections